Haitang is an urban town in Changshou District, Chongqing, People's Republic of China.

Administrative division
, the town is divided into the following nine villages:
Haitang Village
Xiaohe Village
Longfeng Village
Zhuangyan Village
Gulin Village
Jiansheng Village
Qingquan Village
Tuqiao Village
Jinzi Village

References

External links

Divisions of Changshou District
Towns in Chongqing